Fair Oaks Ranch is a city in Bexar, Comal, and Kendall counties in the U.S. state of Texas. The population was 5,986 at the 2010 census and an estimated 9,700 in 2018. It is part of the San Antonio-New Braunfels Metropolitan Statistical Area.

History
The land on which Fair Oaks Ranch rests was acquired in the 1930s by Ralph Fair Sr., who worked in the oil industry and owned cattle and racehorses. A residential community was established by Fair's family in the 1970s and the community was incorporated in 1988.

Geography

The city limits extend southwest to touch Interstate 10 at Exit 546.

Demographics

2020 census

As of the 2020 United States census, there were 9,833 people, 3,771 households, and 2,969 families residing in the city.

2000 census
As of the census of 2000, there were 4,695 people, 1,683 households, and 1,531 families residing in the city. The population density was 656.4 people per square mile (253.5/km2). There were 1,731 housing units at an average density of 242.0/sq mi (93.5/km2). The racial makeup of the city was 96.38% White, 0.38% African American, 0.43% Native American, 0.62% Asian, 0.06% Pacific Islander, 1.04% from other races, and 1.09% from two or more races. Hispanic or Latino of any race were 7.90% of the population.

There were 1,683 households, out of which 34.8% had children under the age of 18 living with them, 86.4% were married couples living together, 3.7% had a female householder with no husband present, and 9.0% were non-families. 7.4% of all households were made up of individuals, and 3.5% had someone living alone who was 65 years of age or older. The average household size was 2.79 and the average family size was 2.93.

In the city, the population was spread out, with 25.1% under the age of 18, 3.8% from 18 to 24, 19.3% from 25 to 44, 38.0% from 45 to 64, and 13.7% who were 65 years of age or older. The median age was 46 years. For every 100 females, there were 101.2 males. For every 100 females age 18 and over, there were 96.9 males.

The median income for a household in the city was $99,685, and the median income for a family was $101,751. Males had a median income of $72,031 versus $43,750 for females. The per capita income for the city was $45,293. About 1.5% of families and 1.7% of the population were below the poverty line, including 1.3% of those under age 18 and 4.4% of those age 65 or over.

Education

The city of Fair Oaks Ranch is served by the Boerne Independent School District. The public schools that serve Fair Oaks Ranch are Fair Oaks Ranch ES (K–5), Kendall ES (K–5), Van Raub ES (K–5), Boerne Middle School South (6–8), Captain Mark Tyler Voss Middle School (6–8), and Boerne Champion High School (9–12).

References

External links
 City of Fair Oaks Ranch official website
 Handbook of Texas Online

Cities in Bexar County, Texas
Cities in Comal County, Texas
Cities in Kendall County, Texas
Cities in Texas
Greater San Antonio